Mutha's Nature is the 45th studio album by American musician James Brown. The album was released in 1977, by Polydor Records. It was arranged by Charles Sherwell and James Brown, with Sarah Pergantis credited for the cover illustration.

Track listing

References

1977 albums
James Brown albums
Albums produced by James Brown
Polydor Records albums